Talašmance is a village in the municipality of Kratovo, North Macedonia.

Demographics
According to the 2002 census, the village had a total of 150 inhabitants. Ethnic groups in the village include:

Macedonians 150

Notable residents

References

Villages in Kratovo Municipality